Salvatore De Meo (born 27 October 1971 in Fondi) is an Italian politician who was elected as a member of the European Parliament in 2019. He took his seat after Brexit.

As of the end of 2022 he was the chairman of the European Parliament Committee on Constitutional Affairs (AFCO).

References

Living people
MEPs for Italy 2019–2024
Forza Italia (2013) MEPs
Forza Italia (2013) politicians
1971 births